Yellowlees is a surname. Notable people with the surname include:

Henry Yellowlees (1919–2006), English medical officer
J. Yellowlees Douglas (born 1962), American academic
Lesley Yellowlees (born 1953), British chemist
Michael Yellowlees (born 1960), Scottish field hockey player
Norm Yellowlees (1912–1991), Canadian ice hockey player
William Yellowlees (1796–1855), Scottish painter